The Hans Filbinger Foundation is a German Christian Democratic foundation that was founded in 1993 by around 100 members of Studienzentrum Weikersheim, including Gerhard Mayer-Vorfelder (at the time Baden-Württemberg's Minister of Finance) and leading journalist Gerhard Löwenthal. It is named after CDU politician Hans Filbinger, the long-time Minister President of Baden-Württemberg. Since 2005, the foundation awards the Hans Filbinger Prize.

External links
https://web.archive.org/web/20100903164137/http://www.hans-filbinger-stiftung.de/

Political and economic think tanks based in Germany
Foundations based in Germany
Political and economic research foundations